Anika Tene Omphroy is an American politician serving as a member of the Florida House of Representatives since 2018. Omphroy represents the State's 95th House District, which includes part of Broward County. She is a member of the Democratic Party.

References

External links
Anika Omphroy House Rep Page

21st-century American politicians
21st-century American women politicians
Candidates in the 2022 United States House of Representatives elections
Living people
Omphroy, Anika
Women state legislators in Florida
Year of birth missing (living people)